Seaforth & Litherland  railway station is a railway station in Seaforth, Merseyside, England, on the Northern Line of the Merseyrail network. It also serves the adjacent area of Litherland.

There are around four trains per hour, taking around 15 minutes to/from Liverpool Central.

History
The main section of the Liverpool, Crosby and Southport Railway (LCSR), that between Waterloo and Southport, opened in July 1848. The LCSR was absorbed by the Lancashire and Yorkshire Railway at the start of 1855. Seaforth station was renamed Seaforth and Litherland in July 1905. The Lancashire and Yorkshire Railway amalgamated with the London and North Western Railway on 1 January 1922 and in turn was Grouped into the London, Midland and Scottish Railway at the start of 1923. Nationalisation followed in 1948 and in 1978 the station became part of the Merseyrail network's Northern Line (operated by British Rail until privatised in 1995).

The station also provided a service from 2 July 1905 to Dingle in south Liverpool (and all intermediate stations running parallel with the Liverpool dock system) via Liverpool on the Liverpool Overhead Railway until 30 December 1956, when the LOR was closed and later demolished. The station underwent improvement work in 2009.

Facilities
The station is staffed 15 minutes before the first service and 15 minutes after the last service. There is platform CCTV, shelters and a booking office. There are departure and arrival screens on the platform for passenger information. The station has a 48-space car park, a cycle rack with 6 spaces and secure storage for 28 cycles. The station is fully wheelchair accessible and access to the station is via a ramp which is 30 metres long.

Gallery

Services
Trains operate every 15 minutes throughout the day from Monday to Saturday and on summer Sundays to Southport to the north, and to Hunts Cross in Liverpool via Liverpool Central to the south. Winter Sunday services are every 30 minutes in each direction.

References

External links

Railway stations in the Metropolitan Borough of Sefton
DfT Category E stations
Former Lancashire and Yorkshire Railway stations
Railway stations in Great Britain opened in 1850
Railway stations served by Merseyrail